Boundji   is a district of the cuvette centrale region in the Republic of the Congo. The capital of the cuvette centrale region lies at Owando.

Towns and villages

References

Cuvette Department
Districts of the Republic of the Congo